Robin Dahl Østrøm (born 9 August 2002) is a professional footballer currently playing as a right-back or a centre-back for  Silkeborg IF. Born in Denmark, he currently represents Norway at youth level.

International career
Østrøm was born in Denmark to a Norwegian father and Ugandan mother. He has been capped as a youth international for Denmark and a U21 international for Norway.

Career statistics

Club

Notes

References

External links
DBU Profile

2002 births
Living people
Footballers from Copenhagen
Danish men's footballers
Denmark youth international footballers
Norway under-21 international footballers
Danish people of Norwegian descent
Danish people of Ugandan descent
Norwegian people of Danish descent
Norwegian people of Ugandan descent
Association football defenders
Danish Superliga players
Boldklubben af 1893 players
Odense Boldklub players
Silkeborg IF players
Norwegian footballers